Benj Pasek and Justin Paul, known together as Pasek and Paul, are an American songwriting duo and composing team for musical theater, films and television. Their works include A Christmas Story, Dogfight, Edges, Dear Evan Hansen, and James and the Giant Peach. Their original songs have been featured on NBC's Smash and in the films La La Land, for which they won both the Golden Globe and Academy Award for Best Original Song for the song "City of Stars", and The Greatest Showman. Their work on the original musical Dear Evan Hansen has received widespread critical acclaim and earned them the 2017 Tony Award for Best Original Score. In 2022, they won the Tony Award for Best Musical for serving as producers for the Broadway production of Michael R. Jackson's Pulitzer Prize-winning musical A Strange Loop.

While Pasek usually writes lyrics and Paul usually writes music, they share credit for both elements. Both are graduates of the University of Michigan and winners of the American Theatre Wing's 2007 Jonathan Larson Grant, which honors achievement by composers, lyricists and librettists.

History

Start at the University of Michigan
Pasek and Paul started working together as freshmen at the University of Michigan. Both got "background" roles in the school's musical theater production, which inspired them to write Edges, a song cycle about the trials and tribulations of moving into adulthood and the search for meaning. Edges premiered in Ann Arbor, Michigan on April 3, 2005.

On May 14, 2006, the duo made their New York City premiere: a benefit concert of original songs titled Become: The Music of Pasek & Paul. Presented by Jamie McGonnigal, performers included Gavin Creel, Cheyenne Jackson, Celia Keenan-Bolger, Jesse Tyler Ferguson, and Steven Pasquale. They also contributed to the 2006 off-Broadway musical White Noise: A Cautionary Musical, which won Talkin' Broadway's 2006 Summer Theatre Festival Citation for Outstanding Original Score. 

In December 2006, they completed their BFA degrees in musical theatre.

Musical theatre

Early projects
Edges proved popular on social media and within several years it had over 200 productions worldwide, with countries including Australia, South Africa, Denmark, France, South Korea, the United Kingdom, Canada, the Philippines, and the United States.

Pasek and Paul wrote the score to the musical adaptation of Roald Dahl's James and the Giant Peach, which premiered in 2010 through Goodspeed Musicals. Other early works include If You Give A Pig A Pancake (2010) and Duck For President for Theatreworks USA, and Dr. Williams, written for the Orchard Project's 24 Hour Musicals benefit. The show starred Jesse Tyler Ferguson and Cheyenne Jackson. Pasek and Paul were featured in the 2011 documentary film One Night Stand about the process. They wrote the lyrics and music to the 2012 musical Dogfight, also contributing to A Christmas Story, The Musical, which was nominated for a Tony Award in 2013 for Best Original Score.

Dear Evan Hansen (2015)
Pasek and Paul wrote the music and lyrics to their musical Dear Evan Hansen. The musical, inspired by the death of a fellow student while Pasek was in high school, features book by Steven Levenson. Directed by Michael Greif and starring Ben Platt, it premiered at the Arena Stage in Washington, D.C. on July 30, 2015. It made its Off-Broadway debut in March 2016 at the Second Stage Theatre, and on Broadway on November 14, 2016, opening three weeks later at the Music Box Theatre. At the 71st Tony Awards, it was nominated for nine awards including Best Musical, Best Score, Best Book of a Musical, and Best Actor in a Musical for Platt. It won six awards including Best Musical and Best Original Score for the duo. At the 2018 Grammy Awards, Dear Evan Hansen won Best Musical Theater Album. The musical received the Edgerton Foundation New Play Award and a 2016 Obie Award for Musical Theatre. The show broke box office records at the Music Box Theatre and became the longest-running production to play the venue in Broadway’s history.

The musical made its West End debut at the Noël Coward Theatre in London on November 19, 2019, following previews in October of the same year. The show was nominated for seven Laurence Olivier Awards at the 2020 ceremony and won three: Best New Musical, Best Actor in a Musical for star Sam Tutty and Best Original Score or New Orchestrations for Pasek and Paul.

Television
The duo have written original music for several television shows. As of 2007, Pasek and Paul were writing music for the Disney Channel show Johnny and the Sprites, with songs used in six episodes and for one story in the season's premiere.

Their original material was featured on season 2 of NBC's Smash in 2013, and have risen to the Top 25 on the iTunes Pop Charts.

Pasek and Paul also wrote the original song "Runnin' Home to You" performed by Grant Gustin for The Flash episode "Duet", a musical crossover between The Flash and Supergirl. Melissa Benoist sang it in Supergirl's "Crisis on Earth-X" crossover episode.

Films
Pasek and Paul wrote the 2016 song "Get Back Up Again" for the film Trolls, as well as five original songs for the 2016 animated direct-to-video feature Tom and Jerry: Back to Oz.

They wrote the lyrics for the musical romantic comedy-drama film La La Land, which had music written by Justin Hurwitz. The film, in its world premiere, was the opening film at the 73rd Venice International Film Festival on August 31, 2016. The film's track "City of Stars", with their lyrics and composition by Justin Hurwitz, won the 2017 Golden Globe Award for Best Original Song. "City of Stars" and "Audition" received nominations for Best Original Song at the 89th Academy Awards, and they won the Academy Award for Best Original Song for "City of Stars." It was then announced in February 2023 that they would reunite with Hurwitz on a stage musical adaptation of the film currently in development, with a book by Ayad Akhtar and Matthew Decker and direction by Bartlett Sher.

Pasek and Paul wrote the songs for the 2017 musical drama film The Greatest Showman. About the Barnum & Bailey Circus, the film premiered on December 8, 2017. The duo's song "This Is Me" won a Golden Globe for Best Original Song and was nominated for Best Original Song at the 90th Academy Awards.

In collaboration with Alan Menken, Pasek and Paul wrote the lyrics for two new songs for Disney's 2019 live action film adaptation of Aladdin. The film also includes original 1992 song compositions written by Menken, Howard Ashman, and Tim Rice. Pasek and Paul will also write songs for Disney's upcoming live-action film, Snow White.

Pasek and Paul also adapted Dear Evan Hansen as a feature film for Universal Pictures and director Stephen Chbosky. They wrote two new songs for the film, including "The Anonymous Ones," which was written in collaboration with Amandla Stenberg for the character of Alana Beck, whom Stenberg plays in the film. They also wrote "A Little Closer" for the character of Connor Murphy, played by Colton Ryan, who reprises the role in which he understudied in the Broadway production. Paul also composed the film's underscore with Dan Romer. It premiered at the 2021 Toronto International Film Festival on September 9, 2021, followed by a release in theaters on September 24, 2021.

They then wrote original songs for Sony Pictures Animation's live-action/animated adaptation of Bernard Waber's children's book Lyle, Lyle, Crocodile. It was released on November 18, 2022.

Musicals

Filmography

Awards and nominations

: Pasek and Paul were the youngest winners of the Jonathan Larson Grant in history.

Personal lives
Pasek is the son of Temple University professor Kathy Hirsh-Pasek. His alma mater is the University of Michigan and Friends' Central School. He is gay.

Paul's alma mater is the University of Michigan and Staples High School. Paul is married; he and his wife have a daughter, born in 2016.

References

External links
 Pasek and Paul website
 
 

American musical duos
American musical theatre composers
American musical theatre lyricists
American songwriting teams
Best Original Song Academy Award-winning songwriters
Broadway composers and lyricists
Friends' Central School alumni
Golden Globe Award-winning musicians
Grammy Award winners
Living people
Male musical theatre composers
Songwriters from Missouri
Songwriters from Pennsylvania
Tony Award winners
University of Michigan School of Music, Theatre & Dance alumni
Year of birth missing (living people)